The Green Tunisia Party, is a Green political party in Tunisia. Legalized only since the Tunisian Revolution in 2011, it participated in the Popular Front coalition until 2014.

History
Founded in 2004 by Abdelkader Zitouni, the party remained illegal under the rule of Zine El Abidine Ben Ali, instead being countered by the newly founded bloc party Green Party for Progress. During this time, it was however internationally recognized by the European Green Party and the Global Greens.

The party was finally one of the three political parties legalized on 17 January 2011. Green Tunisia participated in the foundation of left-wing Popular Front coalition in 2012, but left on 16 May 2014, denouncing the hegemony of Workers' Party leader Hamma Hammami.

References

External links

2004 establishments in Tunisia
2004 in Tunisian politics
2011 in Tunisian politics
Ecosocialist parties
Formerly banned political parties in Tunisia
Global Greens member parties
Green parties in Africa
Political parties established in 2004
Political parties in Tunisia
Socialist parties in Tunisia